Polygrammodes nonagrialis is a moth in the family Crambidae. It is found in Peru.

The wingspan is about 40 mm. Adults are pale ochreous grey-brown, the forewings with a fuscous discoidal lunule. There are traces of a curved postmedial series of fuscous points in the interspaces and of fuscous subterminal streaks towards the apex. The hindwings are whitish, tinged with brownish towards the termen.

References

Moths described in 1899
Spilomelinae
Moths of South America